Software mining is an application of knowledge discovery in the area of software modernization which involves understanding existing software artifacts. This process is related to a concept of reverse engineering. Usually the knowledge obtained from existing software is presented in the form of models to which specific queries can be made when necessary. An entity relationship is a frequent format of representing knowledge obtained from existing software. Object Management Group (OMG) developed specification Knowledge Discovery Metamodel (KDM) which defines an ontology for software assets and their relationships for the purpose of performing knowledge discovery of existing code.

Software mining and data mining
Software mining is closely related to data mining, since existing software artifacts contain enormous business value, key for the evolution of software systems. Knowledge discovery from software systems addresses structure, behavior as well as the data processed by the software system. Instead of mining individual data sets, software mining focuses on metadata, such as database schemas. OMG Knowledge Discovery Metamodel provides an integrated representation to capturing application metadata as part of a holistic existing system metamodel. Another OMG specification, the Common Warehouse Metamodel focuses entirely on mining enterprise metadata.

Text-Mining Software Tools
Text mining software tools enable easy handling of text documents for the purpose of data analysis including automatic model generation and document classification, document clustering, document visualization, dealing with Web documents, and crawling the Web.

Levels of software mining
Knowledge discovery in software is related to a concept of reverse engineering.  Software mining addresses structure, behavior as well as the data processed by the software system.

Mining software systems may happen at various levels:
 program level (individual statements and variables)
 design pattern level
 call graph level (individual procedures and their relationships)
 architectural level (subsystems and their interfaces)
 data level (individual columns and attributes of data stores)
 application level (key data items and their flow through the applications)
 business level (domain concepts, business rules and their implementation in code)

Forms of representing the results of Software Mining
 data model
 metadata
 metamodels
 ontology
 Knowledge representation
 business rule
 Knowledge Discovery Metamodel (KDM)
 Business Process Modeling Notation (BPMN)
 intermediate representation
 Resource Description Framework (RDF)
 abstract syntax tree (AST)
 software metrics
 graphical user interfaces

See also
 Mining Software Repositories

References

Static program analysis tools
Data mining